USS Ohio may refer to:

  was a schooner on Lake Erie during the War of 1812 in commission from 1813 to 1814, captured by British and renamed as HMS Huron
  was a ship of the line, launched in 1820 and in commission as a warship from 1838 to 1840 and from 1846 to 1850, then later used as a receiving ship
  was a Maine-class predreadnought battleship in commission from 1904 to 1922
  was a planned Montana-class battleship cancelled in 1943 before her keel was laid down
 , is an Ohio-class nuclear submarine commissioned in 1981 and currently in service. She was originally launched as a Ballistic Missile Submarine (SSBN), but from 2003-2006 was converted to a Guided Missile Submarine (SSGN) carrying cruise missiles.

See also
 
 
 , an armed brig in commission from 1861 to 1865 that saw service in the American Civil War

United States Navy ship names